Pterygota may refer to:

 Pterygota, a subclass of insects that includes the winged insects
 Hopea pterygota, a flowering plant in the family Dipterocarpaceae
 Pterygota (plant), a genus of plants in the family Sterculiaceae